Lethenteron is a genus of lamprey in the family Petromyzontidae.

Species
There are currently 7 recognized species in this genus:
 Lethenteron alaskense Vladykov & Kott, 1978 (Alaskan brook lamprey)
 Lethenteron appendix (DeKay, 1842) (American brook lamprey)
 Lethenteron camtschaticum (Tilesius, 1811) (Arctic lamprey) (Japanese brook lamprey)
 Lethenteron kessleri (Anikin, 1905) (Siberian brook lamprey)
 Lethenteron ninae Naseka, Tuniyev & Renaud, 2009 (Western Transcaucasian lamprey)
 Lethenteron reissneri (Dybowski, 1869) (Far Eastern brook lamprey) 
 Lethenteron zanandreai (Vladykov, 1955) (Po brook lamprey)

References

 
Jawless fish genera
Taxa named by Carl Leavitt Hubbs
Taxonomy articles created by Polbot